The  is a Japanese railway line in Gifu Prefecture, between Ōgaki Station, Ōgaki and Tarumi Station, Motosu. It is the only railway line  operates. There was a freight rail service that transported cement for Sumitomo Ōsaka Cement of Sumitomo Group Gifu factory. It once accounted for 40% of the whole revenue, but the freight operation ceased in spring 2006.

Basic data
Distance: 
Gauge: 
Stations: 19
Track: Single
Power: Diesel
Railway signalling: Simplified automatic (ATS-S, ST)
Stations with passing loops: 4 (Higashi-Ōgaki, Kitagata-Makuwa, Motosu, and Kōmi)

Stations

History
Approved under the Railway Construction Act as a railway line from Ōgaki via Ōno in Fukui Prefecture to Kanazawa in Ishikawa Prefecture, construction began in 1935, was suspended during the Pacific War and resumed in 1952. Construction beyond there continued until it was suspended in 1979.

Freight services ceased in 1974, and in 1984 (due to its operating deficit, sparse traffic and dead end route) the operation and ownership of the line was transferred from the then Japan National Railways (JNR) to the third-sector Tarumi Railway. A major shareholder was the Sumitomo Cement Co., which began freight shipments from Motosu. The improved financial situation resulted in construction being resumed, and the extension from Kōmi to Tarumi  opened in 1989. The Sumitomo cement traffic ceased in 2006, with the line becoming a passenger-only operation.

See also
List of railway companies in Japan
List of railway lines in Japan

References
This article incorporates material from the corresponding article in the Japanese Wikipedia.

External links 

  

Railway lines in Japan
Rail transport in Gifu Prefecture
Railway lines opened in 1956
1067 mm gauge railways in Japan
Japanese third-sector railway lines